The 1969 Uber Cup was the fifth edition of the Uber Cup, the women's badminton team competition. The tournament took place in the 1968-1969 badminton season, 18 countries competed. Japan won its second title in the Uber Cup, after beating the Indonesia team in the Final Round in Tokyo, Japan.

Teams
18 teams from 4 regions took part in the competition. As defending champion, Japan skipped the qualifications and played directly in the final round of the inter-zone ties (team matches), effectively the semifinals of the tournament. 

Australasian zone
 (exempt from qualifying rounds)

Asian zone
 (exempt from qualifying rounds)

European zone

Panamerican zone

From the qualifying rounds, four countries progressed to the inter-zone ties. From the Australasian zone, Indonesia advanced to the next round after beating Australia 7-0. From the Asian zone the Thailand team beat South Korea 5-2. In the European zone final England defeated East Germany 6-1. From the Pan American zone, United States advanced to the inter-zone ties after beating Canada 5-2 and getting a walkover from Peru.

Inter-zone playoffs

First round

Second round

Final round
Japan won its second consecutive Uber Cup final, having won the tournament in 1966. The Indonesian women won just one of seven matches. That winner was Minarni who beat the reigning All England champion Hiroe Yuki.

Final round

External links
 tangkis.tripod.com
Herbert Scheele ed., The International Badminton Federation Handbook for 1967 (Canterbury, Kent,      England: J. A. Jennings Ltd., 1967) 82–87.
Pat Davis, The Guinness Book of Badminton (Enfield, Middlesex, England: Guinness Superlatives Ltd., 1983) 122, 123.

Uber Cup
Uber Cup
Thomas & Uber Cup